The 1932 World Fencing Championships were held in Copenhagen, Denmark. From 1932 only non-Olympic events were competed for.

Women's events

References

World Fencing Championships
1932 in Danish sport
1932 in fencing
F
International sports competitions in Copenhagen
Fencing competitions in Denmark
1930s in Copenhagen